The following is a list of Commonwealth armoured regiments. The Commonwealth of Nations, normally referred to as the Commonwealth, is an intergovernmental organisation of 54 independent member states. All members except Mozambique and Rwanda were part of the British Empire, out of which the Commonwealth developed.

1
1 South African Tank Regiment
1 Special Service Battalion
1st Armoured Regiment
1st Hussars
1st Queen's Dragoon Guards
1st/15th Royal New South Wales Lancers
6th DCO's Lancers
10th Armoured Regiment
10th Light Horse Regiment
11th Armoured Regiment
11th Cavalry
12e Régiment blindé du Canada
12th Armoured Regiment
12th Cavalry
12th/16th Hunter River Lancers
13th Armoured Regiment
13th Lancers
15th Armoured Regiment
15th Lancers
16th Cavalry
18th Cavalry
19th Armoured Regiment
19th KGO's Lancers
2
2nd Cavalry Regiment
2nd Lancers
2nd/14th Light Horse Regiment (Queensland Mounted Infantry)
20th Lancers
20th Lancers
22nd Cavalry
23rd Cavalry
24th Cavalry
25th Cavalry
26th Cavalry
27th Cavalry
28th Cavalry
29th Cavalry
3
3rd Cavalry
3rd/4th Cavalry Regiment
3rd/9th South Australia Mounted Rifles
30th Cavalry
31st Cavalry
32nd Cavalry
33rd Cavalry
4
4th Armoured Regiment
4th Cavalry
4th Horse
4th Waikato Mounted Rifles
4th/9th Prince of Wales' Light Horse
40th Armoured Regiment
40th Cavalry
41st Armoured Regiment
41st Horse
42nd Armoured Regiment
42 Armoured Regiment (India)
42nd Cavalry
43rd Armoured Regiment
43rd Cavalry
44th Armoured Regiment
45th Armoured Regiment
46th Armoured Regiment
47th Armoured Regiment
48th Armoured Regiment
49th Armoured Regiment
5
5th Armoured Regiment
5th Horse
50th Armoured Regiment
50th Cavalry
51st Armoured Regiment
51st Cavalry
52nd Armoured Regiment
52nd Cavalry
53rd Armoured Regiment
53rd Cavalry
6
6th Armoured Regiment
6th Lancers (DCO's)
61st Cavalry
62nd Cavalry
63rd Cavalry
64th Cavalry
65th Armoured Regiment
66th Armoured Regiment
67th Armoured Regiment
68th Armoured Regiment
69th Armoured Regiment
7
7th Lancers
7th Light Cavalry
70th Armoured Regiment
71st Armoured Regiment
72nd Armoured Regiment
73rd Armoured Regiment
74th Armoured Regiment
75th Armoured Regiment
76th Armoured Regiment
8
8th Canadian Hussars (Princess Louise's)
8th Lancers
8th Light Cavalry
81st Armoured Regiment
82nd Armoured Regiment
83rd Armoured Regiment
84th Armoured Regiment
85th Armoured Regiment
86th Armoured Regiment
87th Armoured Regiment
88th Armoured Regiment
89th Armoured Regiment
9
9th Lancers
9th/12th Royal Lancers (Prince of Wales's)
90th Armoured Regiment
A
Armour Troop, Service and Support Platoon, SKNDF
B
British Columbia Dragoons
British Columbia Regiment (Duke of Connaught's Own)
C
Central India Horse
D
Deccan Horse
E
F
Fort Garry Horse
G
Governor General's Horse Guards
Guides Cavalry FF
H
Halifax Rifles (RCAC)
Household Cavalry Regiment
K
King's Own Calgary Regiment (RCAC)
King's Royal Hussars
Kor Armour DiRaja
L
Le Régiment de Hull (RCAC)
Light Dragoons
Johannesburg Light Horse Regiment
Lord Strathcona's Horse (Royal Canadians)
N
Queen Nandi Mounted Rifles
New Zealand Scottish Regiment
O
Ontario Regiment (RCAC)
P
PAVO (11th) Cavalry FF
Poona Horse
President's Bodyguard
President's Bodyguard
Pretoria Armoured Regiment
Prince Edward Island Regiment (RCAC)
Probyn's Horse
Q
Queen Alexandra's Mounted Rifles
Queen's Own Yeomanry
Queen's Royal Hussars (Queen's Own and Royal Irish)
Queen's Royal Lancers
Queen's York Rangers (1st American Regiment) (RCAC)
R
Reconnaissance Regiment
Molapo Armoured Regiment
laauwberg Armoured Regiment
Thaba Bosiu Armoured Regiment
Rhodesian Armoured Corps
Royal Canadian Dragoons
Royal Canadian Hussars (Montreal)
Royal Dragoon Guards
Royal Mercian and Lancastrian Yeomanry
Royal Scots Dragoon Guards
Royal Tank Regiment
Royal Wessex Yeomanry
Royal Yeomanry
S
Saskatchewan Dragoons
Scinde Horse
Sherbrooke Hussars
Singapore Armoured Regiment
Skinner's Horse
South Alberta Light Horse
U
Umvoti Mounted Rifles
W
Windsor Regiment (RCAC)

See also
List of Commonwealth infantry regiments

Armored regiments